Acleris tremewani is a species of moth of the family Tortricidae. It is found in Myanmar.

References

Moths described in 1964
tremewani
Moths of Asia